Governor Cannon may refer to:

Newton Cannon (1781–1841), 8th Governor of Tennessee
William Cannon (1809–1865), 40th Governor of Delaware